Orlov is a town and the administrative center of Orlovsky District in Kirov Oblast, Russia, located on the right bank of the Vyatka River,  west of Kirov, the administrative center of the oblast. Population:

History
It was first mentioned in 1459. Town status was granted to it in 1780. Between 1923 and 1992 the town was known as Khalturin, after the Russian revolutionary Stepan Khalturin (1856–1882), who was born in a nearby village.

Administrative and municipal status
Within the framework of administrative divisions, Orlov serves as the administrative center of Orlovsky District. As an administrative division, it is incorporated within Orlovsky District as the Town of Orlov. As a municipal division, the Town of Orlov is incorporated within Orlovsky Municipal District as Orlovskoye Urban Settlement.

References

Notes

Sources

Cities and towns in Kirov Oblast
Orlovsky Uyezd (Vyatka Governorate)